Chazhikattu Hospital is a multi-speciality hospital in Thodupuzha, Idukki district in Kerala, India. It was established in 1933 under the Chazhikattu Hospital Trust.

This hospital is known for critical accident care and orthopaedic surgical treatments.

This hospital is listed as one of the institution under the 'Disaster Management Directory – 2009' published by the Government of Kerala.

Departments 
The hospital runs all major medical and surgical services, as well as outpatient facilities and a 24-hour Accident and Emergency department.

References 
 Disaster Management Directory, Kerala Govt.
 QPMA Journal of Medical Science 

Hospital buildings completed in 1933
Buildings and structures in Idukki district
Hospitals in Kerala
1933 establishments in India
20th-century architecture in India